Emergency Contact is a 2018 young adult novel by Mary H.K. Choi. It is her debut novel and was published on March 27, 2018 by Simon & Schuster Books for Young Readers, an imprint of Simon & Schuster. Emergency Contact is a love story conducted primarily by text message, with Penny, a Korean-American freshman at the University of Texas at Austin, giving Sam her number after she happens to be passing by as Sam has his first panic attack.

Background
Choi described the novel as partly inspired by Judy Blume's novel Forever..., because Blume had "said she just wanted to write a story about 'two people who have sex but then nothing terrible happens'...I love that," Choi told The New York Times.

Publication
On October 4, 2017, an excerpt of the novel was published through Entertainment Weekly. Emergency Contact was published in hardcover on March 27, 2018 by Simon & Schuster Books for Young Readers, an imprint of Simon & Schuster. A paperback edition was published on April 9, 2019 by Simon & Schuster Books for Young Readers.

The novel debuted at number nine on The New York Times Young Adult Hardcover best-sellers list on April 22, 2018. It peaked at number eight on the list on May 6, 2018. It spent four weeks on the list.

Reception
Kirkus Reviews criticized the novel's character development as well as its "absence of emotional depth or well-crafted prose."

Publishers Weekly praised Choi's "sharp wit and skillful character development."

Writing for Entertainment Weekly, David Canfield wrote that the novel "vividly realizes Korean-American culture and explores microaggressions on a sharply recognizable level" and wrote that the young adult "frame doesn't push the more challenging material to the margins, but rather renders it naturalistically potent."

References

2018 American novels
2018 debut novels
American young adult novels
Simon & Schuster books
Novels set in Austin, Texas
Campus novels
University of Texas at Austin
Novels by Mary H.K. Choi
Third-person narrative novels